The 1995 Vuelta a España was the 50th edition of the Vuelta a España, one of cycling's Grand Tours. The Vuelta began in Zaragoza, with a prologue individual time trial on 2 September, and Stage 10 occurred on 12 September with a flat stage to Seville. The race finished in Madrid on 24 September.

Prologue
2 September 1995 — Zaragoza to Zaragoza,  (ITT)

Stage 1
3 September 1995 — Zaragoza to Logroño,

Stage 2
4 September 1995 — San Asensio to Santander,

Stage 3
5 September 1995 — Santander to Alto del Naranco,

Stage 4
6 September 1995 — Tapia de Casariego to A Coruña,

Stage 5
7 September 1995 — A Coruña to Ourense,

Stage 6
8 September 1995 — Ourense to Zamora,

Stage 7
9 September 1995 — Salamanca to Salamanca,

Stage 8
10 September 1995 — Salamanca to Ávila,

Stage 9
11 September 1995 — Ávila to Palazuelos de Eresma,

Stage 10
12 September 1995 — Córdoba to Seville,

References

1995 Vuelta a España
Vuelta a España stages